Zsolt Baumgartner (born 1 January 1981) is a Hungarian former racing driver who raced for the Jordan and Minardi teams in Formula One. He remains the only Hungarian driver to have competed and to have scored a point in Formula One.

Career
Baumgartner made his Formula One race debut at the 2003 Hungarian Grand Prix, substituting for the injured Ralph Firman in the Jordan team; he also took part in the Italian Grand Prix that year.

Plans were made for Baumgartner to drive for Jordan again in 2004 with sponsorship from oil company MOL Rt. However, he failed to agree terms with Jordan and was signed by Minardi instead. This caused MOL Rt. to decrease its sponsorship amount, leading Baumgartner and his management to set up a "Zsolt Baumgartner Supporter's Club", a plan similar to that employed by Justin Wilson in 2003.

Baumgartner raced throughout the  Formula One season, and after two near-misses (ninth in Monaco and 10th in Canada) he managed to take Minardi's first point in over two years by finishing eighth (classified second last and the last car to take the chequered flag) in the United States Grand Prix held at Indianapolis Motor Speedway.

Champ Car World Series
In March 2007 he was confirmed as the test and reserve driver for Minardi Team USA, former boss Paul Stoddart's recently acquired Champ Car World Series team. Baumgartner only participated in a handful of tests for the team and made no race starts. Prior to the 2008 season, Champ Car unified with the rival IndyCar Series and Stoddart and the Minardi name left the sport.

Superleague Formula
In 2008 Baumgartner became the test driver for team Tottenham Hotspur F.C. in Superleague Formula.

Racing record

Racing career summary

Complete International Formula 3000 results 
(key)

Complete Formula One results
(key)

References

External links

Official website
Zsolt Baumgartner Blue Flags Profile 

1981 births
Living people
Sportspeople from Debrecen
Hungarian racing drivers
Danube-Swabian people
Hungarian Formula One drivers
German Formula Renault 2.0 drivers
Jordan Formula One drivers
Minardi Formula One drivers
International Formula 3000 drivers
Nordic Racing drivers
Scuderia Coloni drivers